Simian is a Google built, open source, enterprise-class Mac OS X software deployment utility with App Engine-based hosting and a client based on the Munki open-source project.

Simian was released as open-source on January 29, 2011 at the Macworld conference in San Francisco, CA.  The original open-source release was also announced on the Google Open Source Blog.

References

External links 

Classic Mac OS software